Tim Schmidt (born 14 March 1986) is a former Australian rules footballer who played for the Sydney Swans in the Australian Football League.

Originally from South Australian National Football League club West Adelaide, Schmidt was drafted by Sydney with pick number 29 at the 2003 AFL Draft and made his debut on 29 July 2006 against Port Adelaide at AAMI Stadium in Adelaide. 

Schmidt suffered a succession of injuries while at Sydney and announced his retirement at the end of the 2009 AFL season.

In July 2016, Schmidt was appointed head coach of the Greater Western Sydney Giants women's team. The team finished in last place in the inaugural season of AFL Women's in 2017, winning the wooden spoon. He stepped down from the role in July 2017.

Tim has also started a kicking and skills academy called Kicking Dynamics coaching future stars.

Coaching statistics

Statistics are correct to the end of the 2017 season

|- style="background-color: #EAEAEA"
! scope="row" style="font-weight:normal"|2017
|
| 7 || 1 || 5 || 1 || 14.3% || 8 || 8
|- class="sortbottom"
! colspan=2| Career totals
! 7
! 1
! 5
! 1
! 14.3%
! colspan=2|
|}

References

External links

Kicking Dynamics - Ultimate Kicking & Skills Academy

1986 births
Living people
Australian rules footballers from South Australia
Sydney Swans players
West Adelaide Football Club players
AFL Women's coaches